The Coolus helmet (named for Coolus, France) was a type of ancient Celtic and Roman helmet.  It was typically made in bronze or brass and, like the Montefortino type with which it co-existed, was a descendant of Celtic helmet types. The explanation of the choice to use bronze can be attributed to the type of warfare that the helmet was used for; also the cultural affinities have influence on why the helmet was made the way that it was. Within a long process of evolution, Roman military armor for the head developed from early pre-Roman helmets. Rome itself had no proper tradition of such objects, as most of the soldiers of the Early Republic made use of helmets produced by the Etruscans, whose craftsmen were known for their ability to make vessels. The Canterbury helmet from England is an example.

It was fairly plain, except for some ridges or raised panels on the cheekpieces. It was globular or hemispherical in shape (some were  spun on a lathe rather than hammered to shape) with a turned or cast soldered- or riveted-on crest knob. The Coolus helmet has become a well known and recognizable part of historical warfare. An example of this is the well known Thames Coolus helmet. This helmet was dug out of the River Thames in England; the helmet has been in the British Museum since 1950.

The Coolus was replaced by the Imperial helmet type, a more developed form also derived from a Celtic original.

Sources
Legio II Augusta
Legio XXIV
Feugère, Michel (2015), "Helmet", The Encyclopedia of the Roman Army, American Cancer Society, pp. 455–491

References

Ancient Roman helmets